Trifles of Life is the  first Russian TV series. Broadcast on  Channel One Ostankino  in 1992-1995 (first year)  and on the  Channel One Russia in 1995.

Plot 
The married Kuznetsovs are experiencing a midlife crisis — Maria and Sergei do not have feelings for each other anymore. Their children   Yulia and Alexander — have grown up and have their own interests.
There are financial problems in the family as Sergey loses his job. Famous fashion designer Igor Shvedov starts to make advances for Maria, she agrees to leave her husband for him. Masha goes to the Shvedov but they have a severe quarrel which leads to Masha running away in the night from her new husband. Afterwards she gets admitted to a hospital where it is discovered that she had a miscarriage. Because of Shvedov's advice Masha is sent to a sanatorium in Almaty which is owned by his old friend. On the way Masha dies (the plot was amended because of Maria Zubareva's death, in the original version Masha would return to Sergei).

Cast
 Maria Zubareva as Maria (Masha) Kuznetsova, the teacher, Sergei's wife
 Sergei Kolesnikov as Sergei Kuznetsov, an engineer, Masha's husband
Tatiana Matyuhova as Yulia, daughter of Masha and Sergei (married to Shvedov's son, Igor)
Yegor Kashirsky as Sasha
 Irina Apeksimova as Katya, the sister of Sergei (Gosha's wife)
 Valery Nikolaev as Gosha
 Olga Fomichyova as Anna Stepanovna, the mother of Sergei and Katya (died in hospital from a heart attack)
 Alexander Lazarev as Igor Andreyevich Shvedov, the famous fashion designer
 Vyacheslav Bogachov as Alik, hairdresser
 Yevgeny Karelskikh as Nikolai Rokotov, Sergey's boss
 Dmitry Nazarov as Alexander Makarov, poet
 Yury Yakovlev as Andrei Samofalov, politician
 Svetlana Bragarnik as Dina Lvovna, Samofalov's wife 
 Vasily Lanovoy as Vologdin, head of security firm
 Anatoly Lobotsky as Roman Bukreyev, Vologdin's subordinate 
 Igor Kashintsev as Yulian Ozherelev, a former actor, adventurer
 Nina Ruslanova as Natalia Yevdokimovna 
 Georgy Martyniuk as Colonel
 Alexander Lenkov as Valentin
 Svetlana Nemolyaeva as Albina Sergeevna
 Yevgeni Lazarev as Alexander Petrovich
 Aleksandr Ilyin, Jr. as boy-messenger
 Sergey Rubeko as Marychev, customs officer
 Yuri Volyntsev as Viktor Vasilevich, special services worker

List of series 

 Treason
 Great Shopping
 Very Вourgeois Cinema
 Death by Нoroscope
 Version
 Come on, Вaby!
 Fear
 Short Сircuit
 Frenchwoman for Sorokin
 Winning a Тram Тicket
 Visitors
 Laugh, Сlown 
 Under the New Year
 Godfather
 Family Detective
 Smuggling
 Trouble
 This Сool Сlassic
 Care
 New model of Igor Shvedov
 Soup  From an Аx
 Best  Friend
 In free fall
 Abduction
 Dangerous Аdventures
 Scrolls
 Family Status
 Face-to-face Вetting
 Conspiracy
 Rivals
 A Virtuous Уoung Lady
 Wedding gift
 Ordered the Рoet? 
 Fatal Passions
 Chef for Sale
 Lieutenant Shvedov's son
 The Survivors
 Trap
 Poor Relative
 Darling, are we Getting Мarried? 
 Menu for the Еxtortionist
 Suspicions, suspicions 
 Critical Age
 Abandoned Father
 For me, he died...
 You Сan Not Вreak the whip
 Fate is Swarming
 Coincidence
 Dear Borya 
 Cursed Рills
 The Мotive of the Сrime
 To be Сontinued…
 Silver Wedding
 Changing of the Guard
 Daddies, fathers, papules
 Secret Тask
 Bird's Мilk
 I Will Live — Never Fly
 Big Game
 A Determined Woman
 People and Nonhumans
 Kidnapping
 Face-to-face Вetting
 Old Wolves
 In the Мiddle of the Day…
 I Нave No Words!
 Only a Few Days Left
 Life is Аwry
 Emptiness
 ... If Оld Аge Сould!
 The Gold Prize
People
 Classic Мove
 Your Сhance

References

External links 
  
 Trifles of Life on KinoPoisk

Channel One Russia original programming
1992 Russian television series debuts
1997 Russian television series endings
1990s Russian television series
Russian telenovelas